The Church of Our Lady of Health, Cavel is a Roman Catholic church under the Archdiocese of Bombay. It was built by the Portuguese in 1794,
 when it was a chapel under the Padroado jurisdiction.

History
When the old chapel began to decay, a new Church was built in 1812 and was remodelled in 1971. 
There is a beautiful grotto with the statue of the Our Lady of Immaculate Conception, in front of the church.

References

Roman Catholic churches in Mumbai
Roman Catholic churches completed in 1812
Roman Catholic churches in Maharashtra
19th-century Roman Catholic church buildings in India